The 1992 Auckland City mayoral election was part of the New Zealand local elections held that same year. In 1992, elections were held for the Mayor of Auckland plus other local government positions including twenty-four city councillors. The polling was conducted using the standard first-past-the-post electoral method.

Mayoralty results
The following table gives the election results:

Ward results

Candidates were also elected from wards to the Auckland City Council.

References

Mayoral elections in Auckland
1992 elections in New Zealand
Politics of the Auckland Region
1990s in Auckland
October 1992 events in New Zealand